Kopina may refer to the following places in Poland:

 Kopina, Łęczna County in Lublin Voivodeship (east Poland)
 Kopina, Łuków County in Lublin Voivodeship (east Poland)
 Kopina, Parczew County in Lublin Voivodeship (east Poland)
 Kopina, Warmian-Masurian Voivodeship (north-east Poland)